James Ogilvy, 5th Lord Ogilvy of Airlie (died 1606) was a Scottish landowner and diplomat.

Life
Ogilvy was the son of James, Master of Ogilvy, and Katherine Campbell, Countess of Crawford, a daughter of Sir John Campbell of Cawdor. His father, the Master of Ogilvy, was killed in 1547 at the Battle of Pinkie and his mother became the tutor to her children.

His home was Airlie Castle, which he planned to rebuild or extend in 1564.

In June 1562, Lord Ogilvy was injured in a duel with John Gordon of Findlater in Edinburgh. John Gordon was imprisoned until Ogilvy recovered.

In April 1587 Ogilvy wrote to Patrick Vans of Barnbarroch recommending his servant Robert Bruce to join an embassy to Denmark, because they had both recently been in Denmark.

James VI was invited to Denmark in May 1596 by the ambassador Steen Bille to attend the coronation of his brother-in-law Christian IV. He appointed Lord Ogilvy and Peter Young as his ambassadors to go in his place, because his wife Anne of Denmark was pregnant, and they were accredited by Christian IV in a letter dated 6 August 1596. James VI rode from Falkland to Dundee to see them depart. As well as offering James's good wishes, and apologising for the absence of James and Anne of Denmark, they were to ask for ships and troops for a mission planned against the Western islanders of Scotland in 1597.

Marriage and family
Ogilvy married Jean Forbes, a daughter of William, Lord Forbes and Elizabeth Keith. Their children included:
 Margaret Ogilvy, who married (1) George Keith, 5th Earl Marischal, and (2) Sir Alexander Strachan of Thornton
 James Ogilvy, 6th Lord Ogilvy of Airlie, father of James Ogilvy, 1st Earl of Airlie. He joined the court of James VI in October 1580 as a gentleman of the bedchamber.
 David Ogilvy, in July 1602 he was attacked on his way from Holyrood Abbey by followers of the Lindsay family and badly injured and his servant William Innes was killed.
 Francis Ogilvy of Newgrange
 John Ogilvy of Craig. His home, Craig Castle, near the Kirkton of Glenisla, or another house called Craig, nearer Montrose, was slighted following the orders of James VI in October 1594 and March 1595.
 Patrick Ogilvy of Muirtown

References

16th-century Scottish people
Scottish diplomats
Ambassadors of Scotland to Denmark
James
1606 deaths